Albert Hopkins may refer to:

 Bert Hopkins (1874–1931), Australian cricketer
 Albert Cole Hopkins (1837–1911), member of the U.S. House of Representatives from Pennsylvania
 Albert J. Hopkins (1846–1922), Congressman and U.S. Senator from Illinois
 Al Hopkins (1889–1932), American musician
 Albert L. Hopkins, computer scientist
 Albert Lloyd Hopkins (1871–1915), president of Newport News Shipbuilding who died in the sinking of the RMS Lusitania